Jon Luvelli (born February 20, 1979) is an Italian–American street photographer. He has made black and white images of people in Columbia, Missouri and in rural mid-western American townscapes.

Career 
Luvelli was first drawn to photography as a child. His photographs are subjective interpretations.

He has made black and white images depicting idiosyncrasies of people in Columbia, Missouri and in rural mid-western American townscapes. His work conveys social messages, addressing economic and civil issues, in the form of macabre candid photography. His subject matter is the underside of humanity.

In 2016, three of Luvelli's photographs were selected to be part of the permanent collection at the Boone County Historical Society's Walters-Boone County Historical Museum in Columbia, Missouri, its first street photographs. The selection included photographs of the 2015–16 University of Missouri protests, also known as the "Concerned Student 1950" hunger strike. Also in 2016, Luvelli had a solo exhibition at the Museum's Montminy Gallery, of work made on the streets of rural Missouri between 2013 and 2016. Aarik Danielsen of the Columbia Daily Tribune called it "a masterful exhibit".

In 2017, a collection of Luvelli works were added to the State Historical Society of Missouri's permanent art collection.

Solo exhibitions
2016: Unseen Columbia, Montminy Gallery, Walters-Boone County Historical Museum, Columbia, Missouri

Collections
Luvelli's work is held in the following permanent collections:
Walters-Boone County Historical Museum, Columbia, Missouri: 3 prints
State Historical Society of Missouri, Columbia, Missouri

Publications by Luvelli
One Block: Photographs from Jon Luvelli. Everyday Street, 2015. .

References

External links
 
 

Living people
21st-century American photographers
Italian emigrants to the United States
1979 births
Street photographers
People from Como